The 1981 San Miguel Beermen season was the seventh season of the franchise in the Philippine Basketball Association (PBA).

Transactions

Summary
Former U-Tex coach Tommy Manotoc will now be the new head coach of San Miguel Beermen, Manotoc replaces Edgardo Ocampo, who transferred to Toyota Super Diesels at the beginning of the season. 

The Beermen had two returning imports for the Open Conference, Aaron James and James Robinson, both former U-Tex Wranglers under coach Tommy Manotoc. James was part of the champion team from last season while Robinson played for U-Tex in 1979.

After topping the elimination phase in a tie with U-Tex for the best record of 14 wins and four losses in the Open Conference, the Beermen went down at the bottom of the four-team semifinals with one victory against five defeats.  They lost to U-Tex, three games to two, in the series for third place.

In the Reinforced Filipino Conference, San Miguel's import Bobby Turner played three games and was replaced by Ron Roberson, who played for the Beermen in the rest of their remaining assignments, including the round-robin among the four teams that didn't advance in the round of six.

Won-loss record vs Opponents

Roster

References

San Miguel Beermen seasons
San